The Pictou Highlanders was an infantry regiment of the Canadian Army from 1871 until it was amalgamated into the Nova Scotia Highlanders in 1954.

Lineage
Founded in 1871 as the Colchester and Hants Provisional Battalion of Infantry it went through several name changes including, in 1871, the 78th Colchester and Hants, or Highlanders Battalion of Infantry; in 1879 the 78th Colchester, Hants and Pictou Battalion of Infantry, "Highlanders"; in 1900 the 78th Colchester, Hants and Pictou Regiment, "Highlanders"; in 1910 the 78th Pictou Regiment "Highlanders"; in 1921 The Pictou Highlanders; and in 1946 - The Pictou Highlanders (Motor).

History 
With the outbreak of the First World War, the 78th Pictou Regiment (Highlanders) raised volunteers for the overseas battalions of the Canadian Expeditionary Force.  During the Second World War, The Pictou Highlanders were active in a defensive role but were never engaged in battle.  Details of the regiment were raised for local protective duty on September 1, 1939, and full mobilization occurred on January 1, 1941.  The first move that the regiment made was to Newfoundland for coastal defense duty from March until August 1943.  In September of the year, one company was dispatched to Nassau, Bahamas where it performed garrison duty until March 1946.  A second company entitled Special Infantry Company (Pictou Highlanders) was mobilized on September 10, 1942, for service in Bermuda from November 12, 1942, to April 1, 1946.  Their duties performed, both the active battalion and the Special Infantry Company were disbanded on April 30, 1946.  During the life of the active units, a 2nd Battalion also served in Canada in the Reserve Army.

In 1954, as a result of the Kennedy Report on the Reserve Army, this regiment was amalgamated with The North Nova Scotia Highlanders to form the 1st Battalion of The Nova Scotia Highlanders with The Cape Breton Highlanders forming the 2nd Battalion.

The Pictou Highlanders before amalgamation held its final Order of Precedence as 33.

Alliances and Uniform 
The Pictou Highlanders were allied to The Seaforth Highlanders (Rossshire Buffs, The Duke of Albany's) and were kitted as Seaforth's except for regimental badges and the Bugle cords were Royal.

Perpetuations 
The regiment perpetuated the following units

The Great War 

 17th Battalion (Nova Scotia Highlanders), CEF
 246th (Nova Scotia Highlanders) Battalion, CEF

Battle honours

Ypres, 1915
Festubert, 1915
Mount Sorrel
Somme, 1916
Amiens

See also 

 Canadian-Scottish regiment

Notes and references

Barnes, RM, The Uniforms and History of the Scottish Regiments, London, Sphere Books Limited, 1972.

External links
 http://nshighlanders.fav.cc/history.html  -  Nova Scotia Highlanders Regimental Museum

Nova Scotia Highlanders
Highland & Scottish regiments of Canada
Highland regiments
Military units and formations established in 1920
New Glasgow, Nova Scotia
Infantry regiments of Canada in World War II
Military units and formations in Bermuda in World War II
Military regiments raised in Nova Scotia
Military units and formations disestablished in 1954